Polaris Fashion Place is a two level shopping mall and surrounding retail plaza serving Columbus, Ohio, United States. The mall, owned locally by Washington Prime Group, is located off Interstate 71 on Polaris Parkway in Delaware County just to the north of the boundary between Delaware and Franklin County. The mall features five anchor stores, Saks Fifth Avenue, Von Maur, Macy's, JCPenney, and a combination of Dick's Sporting Goods/Public Lands, as well as an outdoor promenade which includes Forever 21, Dave & Buster's, and Barnes & Noble.

The mall is part of the much larger 1200 acre POLARIS Centers of Commerce real estate development in northern Columbus. This development includes the McCoy Center, the Polaris Founder's Park along with over a hundred other commercial and residential developments.

History
Glimcher Realty Trust began construction on Polaris Fashion Place in June 2000. The mall opened in November 2001 with 146 inline tenants. The developers chose to include several tenants which were lacking in the market, including four of the seven anchor stores: Kaufmann's, The Great Indoors, Lord & Taylor, and Saks Fifth Avenue. The other three anchors were JCPenney, Sears and Lazarus; all three relocated from Northland Mall, which closed on October 31, 2002 following the loss of its remaining inline tenants and the Northland Mall was demolished in February 2004.

In 2003, the Lazarus store was dual-branded as Lazarus-Macy's, and then to just Macy's in 2005. After the 2006 acquisition by Federated Stores (now Macy's, Inc.) of Kaufmann's parent company, May Department Stores Company, the Kaufmann's store was shuttered and sold to Glimcher for redevelopment. In 2007, the store was demolished for an outdoor expansion comprising Barnes & Noble, Forever 21 and several restaurants, including Benihana, The Cheesecake Factory and Dave & Buster's. This concourse opened in 2008. Lord & Taylor was repositioned and shuttered entirely in 2004. It was replaced with Von Maur, whose location at the mall is also the first in the state.

On February 22, 2012, Sears Holdings Corporation announced it would be closing all 9 of its Great Indoors. In March 2015 it was announced that the space would be replaced by a new Dick's Sporting Goods and Field & Stream (now Public Lands) by October 2015.

In 2019, Sears closed. In 2020, it was announced that the space will be razed for a mixed-use development.

In March 2021, the mall saw two separate shooting incidents within the interior corridors, on March 3 and 15. These were the first such incidents in the mall's history.

References

External links 
 

Shopping malls in Columbus, Ohio
Shopping malls established in 2001
Washington Prime Group
2001 establishments in Ohio